Henry Esmond may refer to:

 The History of Henry Esmond, an 1852 historical novel by William Makepeace Thackeray
 Henry Esmond, Esq. the putative author (and protagonist) of The History of Henry Esmond, or William Makepeace Thackeray
 Henry V. Esmond (1869–1922), British actor and playwright